Dimorphorchis is a genus of flowering plants from the orchid family, Orchidaceae. It contains 9 species, which are native to 	Papua New Guinea, the Philippines, Indonesia, Malaysia, Solomon Islands, and Brunei.

Taxonomy

Species
It has nine species:
Dimorphorchis beccarii (Rchb.f.) Kocyan & Schuit.
Dimorphorchis breviscapa (J.J.Sm.) Kocyan & Schuit.
Dimorphorchis celebica (Schltr.) Ormerod
Dimorphorchis graciliscapa (A.Lamb & Shim) P.J.Cribb
Dimorphorchis lowii (Lindl.) Rolfe
Dimorphorchis lyonii (Ames) Ormerod
Dimorphorchis rohaniana (Rchb.f.) P.J.Cribb
Dimorphorchis rossii Fowlie
Dimorphorchis tenomensis (A.Lamb) P.J.Cribb

References

External links 

Vandeae genera
Aeridinae